Top Spin 2 is a 2006 tennis video game developed by Indie Built, MENT, and Aspyr and originally published by 2K Sports and Superscape. It is the sequel to Top Spin and is followed by Top Spin 3.

Development
The game was showcased at E3 2005.

Reception

The game received "mixed or average reviews" on all platforms except the Xbox 360 version, which received "generally favorable reviews", according to the review aggregation website Metacritic. In Japan, Famitsu gave it a score of 27 out of 40, while Famitsu Xbox 360 gave it a score of all four sevens for a total of 28 out of 40. Nintendo Power gave the DS version a mixed review, about two months before it was released. Edge gave the Xbox 360 version eight out of ten and said: "Developer PAM has reinvented a game that no longer strives to be a thinking man's alternative to Virtua [Tennis], but something altogether superior". However, Computer Games Magazine gave the same console version three out of five and called it "the most complete tennis experience on any platform to date".

References

External links
 
 

2006 video games
2K Sports games
Tennis video games
Xbox 360 games
Game Boy Advance games
Nintendo DS games
Mobile games
Sports video games set in Italy
Sports video games set in the United States
Windows games
Video games developed in the United States
Video games set in Australia
Video games set in Austria
Video games set in England
Video games set in France
Video games set in Greece
Video games set in India
Video games set in Japan
Video games set in Mexico
Video games set in Portugal
Video games set in Sweden
Take-Two Interactive games
Aspyr games
Multiplayer and single-player video games
Superscape games